TNA One Night Only (2016) is a series of professional wrestling One Night Only events held by Total Nonstop Action Wrestling (TNA) in 2016.

One Night Only: Live!

One Night Only: Live! was a professional wrestling  pay-per-view (PPV) event produced by Total Nonstop Action Wrestling (TNA), which took place on January 8, 2016 at the Sands Bethlehem Event Center in Bethlehem, Pennsylvania.

 Gauntlet Battle Royal

Rivals 2016

One Night Only: Rivals 2016 was a professional wrestling pay-per-view (PPV) event produced by Total Nonstop Action Wrestling (TNA), where TNA held a series of matches featuring various TNA wrestlers in current feuds as well as renewing some heated feuds from TNA's history. The show was taped in parts on January 5–7, 2016 at the Sands Bethlehem Event Center in Bethlehem, Pennsylvania and aired on PPV on February 5, 2016.

Joker's Wild 2016

One Night Only: Joker's Wild 2016 was a professional wrestling pay-per-view (PPV) event produced by Total Nonstop Action Wrestling (TNA), where twenty-four men and two women competed in a tournament for $100,000. It consisted of tag team matches in which the partners were randomly drawn in a lottery and teams had to work together to advance to the main event battle royal, with the grand prize of US$100,000. Some of the matches took place on January 7 and 9, 2016, from the Sands Bethlehem Event Center in Bethlehem, Pennsylvania while others took place on January 30–31, 2016, from the Wembley Arena in London, England and the Barclaycard Arena in Birmingham, England, with the event airing on PPV on March 4, 2016.

Knockouts Knockdown 2016

One Night Only: Knockouts Knockdown 2016 was a professional wrestling pay-per-view (PPV) event produced by Total Nonstop Action Wrestling (TNA), where TNA held a series of matches featuring eight TNA Knockouts going up against eight indie wrestlers. The winner of these matches would advance to a Knockouts Gauntlet match to crown the "Queen of the Knockouts." The event took place on March 17, 2016, from the Impact Zone in Universal Studios in Orlando, Florida, and aired on PPV on April 22, 2016.

The match between Rebel and Shelly Martinez was named Worst Match of the Year in the Wrestling Observer Newsletter awards for 2016.

 Gauntlet Battle Royal

Victory Road 2016

One Night Only: Victory Road 2016 was a professional wrestling pay-per-view (PPV) event produced by Total Nonstop Action Wrestling (TNA). Matches for Victory Road were filmed at the March 17–19, 2016 tapings from the Impact Zone in Orlando, Florida, and aired on PPV on May 20, 2016. The event marked the final TNA appearances for TNA Originals Velvet Sky and Bobby Roode.

World Cup 2016

One Night Only: World Cup 2016 is a professional wrestling pay-per-view (PPV) event produced by Total Nonstop Action Wrestling (TNA). Teams of wrestlers and knockouts led by a male TNA wrestler will compete in singles, tag team and knockouts matches. The team that gains the most points qualify to the final match to fight for the TNA World Cup. The event took place on June 13, 2016 from the Impact Zone in Universal Studios in Orlando, Florida.

Teams and members
.

 Team Storm
 James Storm (Captain)
 Bram
 Trevor Lee
 Basile Baraka
 Madison Rayne

 Team Drake
 Eli Drake (Captain)
 Drew Galloway
 Mahabali Shera
 Baron Dax
 Sienna

 Team Hardy
 Jeff Hardy (Captain)
 Eddie Edwards
 Jessie Godderz
 Robbie E
 Jade

 Team Bennett
 Mike Bennett (Captain)
 Ethan Carter III
 Crazzy Steve
 Grado
 Rosemary

 Points

X-Travaganza 2016

One Night Only: X-Travaganza 2016 was a professional wrestling pay-per-view (PPV) event produced by Total Nonstop Action Wrestling (TNA). TNA held series of matches featuring various X Division wrestlers paying tribute and honoring the X Division by taking on five outside indy wrestlers – Chuck Taylor, Jonathan Gresham, David Starr, J. T. Dunn and Zenshi – in qualifying matches where the winner, would move on to compete in a Ladder match for a number one contenders spot for the TNA X Division Championship. Tapings took place on July 13 and 14, 2016, from the Impact Zone in Universal Studios in Orlando, Florida.

September 2016

One Night Only: September 2016 was a professional wrestling pay-per-view (PPV) event produced by Total Nonstop Action Wrestling (TNA).  Tapings took place on August 11–14, 2016 from the Impact Zone in Universal Studios in Orlando, Florida. The event primarily consisted of wrestlers typically known for fighting in the X Division taking on heavyweights.

Against All Odds

One Night Only: Against All Odds was a professional wrestling pay-per-view (PPV) event produced by Total Nonstop Action Wrestling (TNA).  Tapings took place on August 16–17, 2016 from the Impact Zone in Universal Studios in Orlando, Florida.

December 2016

One Night Only: December 2016 was a professional wrestling pay-per-view (PPV) event produced by Total Nonstop Action Wrestling (TNA).  Tapings took place on October 5, 2016 from the Impact Zone in Universal Studios in Orlando, Florida.

References

2016 in professional wrestling
2016
Professional wrestling in Pennsylvania
Professional wrestling in England
Professional wrestling in Orlando, Florida
Events in Pennsylvania
Events in London
Events in Birmingham, West Midlands
Events in Orlando, Florida
2016 in Pennsylvania
2016 in England
2016 in professional wrestling in Florida